Ciarán James O'Keeffe (born 21 March 1971) is an English psychologist specialising in parapsychology and forensic psychology. Ciarán attended John Hampdon Grammar school in High Wycombe, Buckinghamshire and had a brief spell at High Wycombe Music Centre. He is currently employed at Bucks New University. He has held a research associate position at the University of Toulouse II - Le Mirail and also an online tutor position at Derby University. Previously employed at Liverpool Hope University, lecturing in psychology with a parapsychology component, O'Keeffe is a member of the Society for Psychical Research and an advisor to The Ghost Club. According to his own website, he completed his PhD at the University of Hertfordshire under the supervision of Richard Wiseman and Julia Buckroyd.

Television career
O'Keeffe became known in the United Kingdom following his appearances on Living TV's paranormal television series Most Haunted and Jane Goldman Investigates, where he performs the role of parapsychologist and paranormal investigator. He also featured in National Geographic Channel's 2005 series Paranormal?. O'Keeffe is an open-minded skeptic on most paranormal phenomena.

Other information
O'Keeffe attended Washington College in Chestertown, Maryland, where he double majored in music and psychology. He then completed a MSc in investigative psychology at the University of Liverpool before studying for his PhD at University of Hertfordshire. He is currently the Academic Head of Department and Senior Lecturer for Psychology at Buckinghamshire New University.

References

External links
 
 Ciarán O'Keeffe's official website
 Ciarán O'Keeffe's official online School

Academics of Liverpool Hope University
English people of Irish descent
English people of Swedish descent
Irish people of Swedish descent
Living people
Parapsychologists
Alumni of the University of Hertfordshire
1971 births